Centre Street South is a planned and approved CTrain light rail station in Calgary, Alberta, Canada part of the Green Line. Construction will begin in 2023 and complete in 2027 as part of construction stage one, segment 2A. The station is located in the Beltline, immediately south of downtown Calgary. 

The station will be located under 11 Avenue South, near Centre Street South and will have a concourse level above the platform. It will provide access to the urban community's high-density residential, commercial and retail buildings, as well as the Calgary Tower, the Central Library and the Sheldon M. Chumir Hospital. The station and the surrounding streetscape will feature Crime Prevention Through Environmental Design principles to mitigate crime.

References 

CTrain stations
Railway stations scheduled to open in 2027
Railway stations located underground in Canada